Dypsidinae is a subtribe of plants in the family Arecaceae.

Genera:
Dypsis
Lemurophoenix
Marojejya
Masoala

References

 
Arecaceae subtribes